Kousa may refer to:

 Kousa dogwood (Cornus kousa)
 kousa or kōsa, known as Asian Dust
 Kōsa (also known as Honganji Kennyo), the leader of Ishiyama Hongan-ji and Ikkō-Ikki rebels.
 Kousa or kusa, a type of squash (fruit) in the Levant, similar to the zucchini